The 1972–73 European Cup Winners' Cup football club tournament was won by Milan after a 1–0 victory against Leeds United at the Kaftanzoglio Stadium, Thessaloniki, Greece.

Competition holders Rangers would have been eligible to compete in the Cup Winners' Cup, but were banned from European competition in the 1972–73 season due to the violent disturbances at the 1972 European Cup Winners' Cup Final.

First round 

|}

First leg

Second leg

AC Milan won 7–1 on aggregate.

Leeds United won 2–1 on aggregate.

Rapid București won 3–1 on aggregate.

Hajduk Split won 2–0 on aggregate.

Hibernian won 7–3 on aggregate.

Second round 

|}

First leg

Second leg

AC Milan won 3–2 on aggregate.

Leeds United won 2–0 on aggregate.

Rapid București won 4–2 on aggregate.

Hajduk Split 3–3 Wrexham on aggregate. Hajduk Split won on an away goals rule.

Quarter-finals 

|}

First leg

Second leg

AC Milan won 2–1 on aggregate.

Leeds United won 8–1 on aggregate.

Slavia Prague won 4–2 on aggregate.

Hajduk Split won 5–4 on aggregate.

Semi-finals 

|}

First leg

Second leg

Leeds United won 1–0 on aggregate.

Milan won 2–0 on aggregate.

Final

See also
 1972–73 European Cup
 1972–73 UEFA Cup

References

External links 
 1972–73 competition at UEFA website
 Cup Winners' Cup results at Rec.Sport.Soccer Statistics Foundation
  Cup Winners Cup Seasons 1972–73 – results, protocols
 website Football Archive  1972–73 Cup Winners Cup

3
UEFA Cup Winners' Cup seasons